Vermilion Catholic High School is a private, Roman Catholic high school in Abbeville, Louisiana.  It is located in the Roman Catholic Diocese of Lafayette.

Athletics
Vermilion Catholic athletics competes in the LHSAA.

Championships
Football championships
(2) State Championships: 2003, 2013

Notable alumni
 Bob Hensgens, Republican Louisiana state representative from Cameron and Vermilion parishes.
 Catherine Romaine, 2018-2019 Louisiana Senior Beta Club Vice President

References

External links
 School Website

Catholic secondary schools in Louisiana
Schools in Vermilion Parish, Louisiana
Abbeville, Louisiana